The Sou'wester 51 is an American sailboat that was designed by McCurdy & Rhodes as a racer-cruiser and first built in 1984.

The Sou'wester 51 design was developed into the center cockpit Sou'wester 51 CC in 1986. The 1991 Sou'wester 52 also used the same hull design.

Production
The design was built by Hinckley Yachts in the United States, starting in 1984, but it is now out of production.

Design
The Sou'wester 51 is a recreational keelboat, built predominantly of fiberglass, with wood trim. It has a masthead sloop rig, a raked stem; a raised counter, angled transom; a skeg-mounted rudder controlled by a wheel and a fixed fin keel with a retractable centerboard. It displaces  and carries  of lead ballast.

A short mast version was also available.

The boat is fitted with an inboard engine for docking and maneuvering.

The design has sleeping accommodation for four people, with a double berth in the bow cabin and an aft cabin with a double berth on the port side. The galley is located on the port side just forward of the companionway ladder. The galley is "U"-shaped and is equipped with a four-burner stove, an ice box and a double sink. A navigation station is opposite the galley, on the starboard side. There are two heads, one just aft of the bow cabin on the port side and one on the starboard side in the aft cabin.

Operational history
The Sou'wester 51 won a number of races, including the Edgartown Race Week, the Halifax Race, as well as the Bermuda Race and the New York Yacht Club Annual Cruise.

See also
List of sailing boat types

References

Keelboats
1980s sailboat type designs
Sailing yachts 
Sailboat type designs by McCurdy & Rhodes
Sailboat types built by Hinckley Yachts